Gustavsvik Manor was a manor house. The building was struck by a fire in 1967 and was never rebuilt.

The manor was located in Kristinehamn Municipality, Värmland County, Sweden.

Gustavsvik was located within a park-like garden, that is still preserved.

In 1736, Gustavsvik was acquired by the Linroth family.

See also 

 List of castles and palaces in Sweden

References

Further reading 

 
 

Buildings and structures in Kristinehamn Municipality
Manor houses in Sweden
1967 fires in Europe